Abdulahi is both a surname and a given name. Notable people with the name include:

Denis Abdulahi (born 1990), Finnish footballer
Liban Abdulahi (born 1995), Dutch footballer
Shami Abdulahi (born 1974), Ethiopian long-distance runner
Abdulahi Bala Adamu, Nigerian politician
Abdulahi Mohamed Sa'adi (born 1934), Ethiopian politician